The 2022 Monte-Carlo Masters (also known as the Rolex Monte-Carlo Masters for sponsorship reasons) was a tennis tournament for male professionals, played on outdoor clay courts. It was the 115th edition of the annual Monte Carlo Masters tournament, sponsored by Rolex for the 13th time. It was held at the Monte Carlo Country Club in Roquebrune-Cap-Martin, France (though billed as Monte Carlo, Monaco). The event was part of the ATP Masters 1000 on the 2022 ATP Tour.

Champions

Singles

  Stefanos Tsitsipas def.  Alejandro Davidovich Fokina, 6–3, 7–6(7–3)

Doubles

  Rajeev Ram /  Joe Salisbury def.  Juan Sebastián Cabal /  Robert Farah, 6–4, 3–6, [10–7]

Points
Because the Monte Carlo Masters is the non-mandatory Masters 1000 event, special rules regarding points distribution are in place. The Monte Carlo Masters counts as one of a player's 500 level tournaments, while distributing Masters 1000 points.

Prize money 

*per team

Singles main draw entrants

Seeds

1 Rankings are as of 4 April 2022

Other entrants
The following players received wildcards into the main draw:
  Lucas Catarina
  David Goffin
  Jo-Wilfried Tsonga
  Stan Wawrinka

The following player received entry using a protected ranking into the singles main draw:
  Borna Ćorić

The following players received entry via the qualifying draw:
  Sebastián Báez
  Hugo Dellien
  Jiří Lehečka
  Jaume Munar
  Holger Rune
  Emil Ruusuvuori
  Bernabé Zapata Miralles

The following players received entry as lucky losers:
  Benjamin Bonzi
  Maxime Cressy
  Oscar Otte

Withdrawals
  Roberto Bautista Agut → replaced by  Benjamin Bonzi 
  Matteo Berrettini → replaced by  Arthur Rinderknech 
  Cristian Garín → replaced by  Oscar Otte 
  Dominik Koepfer → replaced by  Marcos Giron
  Daniil Medvedev → replaced by  Tallon Griekspoor
  Gaël Monfils → replaced by  Maxime Cressy
  Rafael Nadal → replaced by  Benoît Paire
  Dominic Thiem → replaced by  Lorenzo Musetti

Doubles main draw entrants

Seeds

1 Rankings are as of 4 April 2022.

Other entrants
The following pairs received wildcards into the doubles main draw:
  Romain Arneodo /  Hugo Nys 
  Marcelo Melo /  Alexander Zverev
  Petros Tsitsipas /  Stefanos Tsitsipas

Withdrawals
Before the tournament
  Jamie Murray /  Bruno Soares → replaced by  Rohan Bopanna /  Jamie Murray 
  John Peers /  Filip Polášek → replaced by  Aslan Karatsev /  John Peers
  Raven Klaasen /  Ben McLachlan → replaced by  Nikoloz Basilashvili /  Alexander Bublik

References

External links
 
 (ATP) tournament profile

 
2022 ATP Tour
2022
2022 in French sport
2022 in Monégasque sport
April 2022 sports events in France